Tegostoma aequifascialis is a moth in the family Crambidae. It was described by Hans Zerny in 1917. It is found in Sudan.

References

Odontiini
Moths described in 1917
Moths of Africa
Taxa named by Hans Zerny